Tosc, formerly also known as Tolstec, is a mountain of the central Julian Alps, located in Upper Carniola, western Slovenia.

The mountain stands south of Triglav, rising above the Voje Valley to the south and Big Field Pasture (Planina Velo polje) to the west. There is a steep gorge in it facing the Krma Valley to the northeast.

Recreation
Tosc is protected within Triglav National Park. Its southern slope is frequently used by ski tourers.

Routes
 3¾h From Pokljuka (1340 m) (easy route)
 4¼h From Uskovnica (1200 m) (challenging route)

References

External links 
 Tosc on  Hribi.net: Route description and Photos (slo)

Mountains of the Julian Alps
Triglav National Park
Two-thousanders of Slovenia